Hounsdown School is a secondary school in Totton, near Southampton, Hampshire, England  The school has 1,215 pupils, spanning ages 11 to 16. Classes are held in renovated 1960s buildings and new specialist blocks built since 2000.

Science College and Academy status
Hounsdown gained Science College status in 2005, and the school changed its official title to 'Hounsdown School – A Science College'. With the new title came a new logo, new uniform and a £500,000 government grant to be spent on science equipment. However, rather than spending all the money on science equipment, part was spent to buy a new sports hall.

On 1 August 2011, Hounsdown School officially gained academy status.

Ofsted
The school's most recent Ofsted inspection judgement, in 2017, was Outstanding.

Department for Education Investment
In May 2013, Hounsdown School was successful in achieving approximately  £1.3 million for essential Capital refurbishments/decorating works.

Structure
Pupils begin at the school in year seven, most having attended one of the three feeder primary schools: Abbotswood Junior School (majority), Bartley Junior School or Foxhills Junior School. Until KS3 SATs were abandoned nationally, pupils studied the Key Stage 3 syllabus until the SATs. In 2005, instead of taking SATs in year nine, the decision was taken that students would take them in year 8 to give students an extra year of GCSE help. They then pick a cycle of three subjects at the end of year 8 (e.g. drama, music, history) and a language to carry on into year nine. Students then try out these subjects and pick their final GCSE options at the end of year nine, which they could drop at any time during year 10. Many schools in Scotland and Wales use a more traditional system, which, in year nine, has pupils consolidating their learning from primary school and KS3. GCSE courses start for all subjects in year 10, with the examinations held during the summer term of year 11. Pupils can then enter employment, or continue their education at 6th Form College.

Colleges which most students go onto from Hounsdown are Totton, and Brockenhurst.

Key Stage Four
Unlike most schools, pupils at Hounsdown start studying for their GCSE in year nine, rather than year 10. The pupils choose their GCSE options at the start of year nine, but they can be changed at the start of year 10 at the pupil's behest. Compulsory subjects including Science, Mathematics, English, ICT and Religious Education (also known as Applied Ethics) although this may be subject to change. Students were previously required to take one foreign language as well as a course from the Design and Technology category but these are no longer compulsory.

Most students take their final GCSE exams in Year 11 but some students take them in Year 10 for particular subjects. Coursework, commonly associated with subjects such as Art and Design and Technology, is also accounted towards their final GCSE grades.

Resource centre
The Resources Centre provides a wide range of materials for pupils to use for their coursework in different subjects. The Resources Centre is involved with the Hampshire Book Award, and pupils regularly review new books for the school's library service.

The library keeps audio tapes, CDs, and computers, the latter of which include word-processing programs. Photocopying and document-production is also available at the library. The Library has movie editing facilities and has a range of Technical Resources.

Facilities/ Sport
The school provides for hire a swimming pool (although this has been block booked by the Swim School Academy for the last couple of years and is no longer available for other clubs), two rugby pitches, two football pitches, their classrooms, the sports hall and the Library (Resources Centre). The Main hall provides a large and flexible staging area where concerts and productions are regularly performed, and is also equipped with lighting and PA theatre equipment. The School provides 6 ICT suites and in early 2013, the school applied for funding for an Apple Mac suite, now situated in the Art block. The Library (Resources Centre) was recently refurbished in 2009 and provides a vast array of books, as well as 50 Networked computers, and a number of Apple Macs. The school has 10 science laboratories, a sports hall and 3 Drama studios and a brand new dance studio, each fitted with multi-fixture lighting rigs and PA systems, also used for lower scale productions. In 2014, the East Block was completed of Re-cladding, a brand-new purpose built Dance Studio was built next to the Sports Hall and the Music areas were refurbished with the inclusion of a new recording studio for GCSE work and professional standard compositions. In 2005, the year 10 team reached the National Cup Semi-Finals losing to Bayhouse in Fareham, Matt Ritchie, who now plays for Newcastle scored 2 goals. In 2018, The year 9 football team successfully reached the national cup quarter finals after defeating Steyning grammar school (Worthing, Sussex) with goals from Harvey Hughes, Joseph “Jando” Stevens, Callum Stratton and Billy Lightfoot.
In 2020 a new history block was established and has now been completed, no temporary classrooms were needed as the new state-of-the-art block was built in a different area of the school grounds.

Hounsdown Eco-School status
Hounsdown has an eco-school system that consists of 72 representatives (2 from each tutor group). There is an eco-school club that runs every Monday at lunchtime, which is led by the science department's community links class teacher and is run mainly by the lead team that consists of pupils from all years that have shown a high interest in Eco schools. The school has won the bronze and silver awards and achieved the green flag which was raised on 22 October 2009.

Organic garden project

The Organic Garden Project is a project funded by the Young Roots Lottery fund. The project is a pupil-led, fully functional organic garden behind the drama and sports hall it was opened by Chris Packham in 2009.

BBC School Report
Hounsdown is part of the Annual BBC Project – BBC School Report – during the time in which the school has been running the project, they have created many Reports which can be viewed on the school website, including a report on the Closure of the Southampton General Heart Unit, which was broadcast on live BBC South Today on 25 March 2011.

Drink spike scandal
The school was in the news in 2015 due to an incident that took place in a Year 11 class. A pupil's drink was spiked with hydrochloric acid. Two students were suspended over the incident pending investigation. These students were then allowed to return to the school on an isolated basis.

References

External links
 

Secondary schools in Hampshire
Academies in Hampshire